The Edwin H. Farnum House is an historic house at the junction of Putnam Pike (United States Route 44) and Collins Street in Johnston, Rhode Island.  It is a two-story wood-frame structure, five bays wide, with a large central chimney.  It was built c. 1765, either by Stephen Angell or his son Daniel, and enlarged about 1795 by Edwin Farnum.  The main entry exhibits Federal styling probably added by Farnum, with 3/4 length sidelight windows and a segmented fanlight above.  The right-side bays on the first floor have been replaced by a 20th-century bay window.

The house was listed on the National Register of Historic Places in 1974.

See also
Daniel Angell House, owned by (and once thought to be built by) Daniel Angell
National Register of Historic Places listings in Providence County, Rhode Island

References

Houses on the National Register of Historic Places in Rhode Island
Houses in Providence County, Rhode Island
Buildings and structures in Johnston, Rhode Island
National Register of Historic Places in Providence County, Rhode Island
Federal architecture in Rhode Island